Heterolocha biplagiata is a moth in the family Geometridae first described by Max Bastelberger in 1909. It is found in Taiwan.

The wingspan is 28–33 mm.

References

Moths described in 1909
Ourapterygini